Over the past 150 years, anarchists, anarcho-syndicalists and libertarian socialists have held many congresses, conferences and international meetings in which trade unions, other groups and individuals have participated.

The First International 
The original International Workingmen's Association (IWMA), often known today as the First International, grouped together workers' societies of various socialist tendencies, including Mutualists, Blanquists, Owenites and republicans, though the most prominent were undoubtedly the Collectivists, grouped around Mikhail Bakunin and the Communists, led by Karl Marx. Towards the end of the First International, the Collectivists adopted Communist positions, but differed from the Marxists in their absolute rejection of authority, both within the International and in their strategic vision for the social revolution, which must immediately abolish the State and not, as with the Marxists, use it in order to gradually establish a communist society.

In these early years of the international socialist movement, the IWMA held 5 congresses attended by both these latter tendencies, at which the differences between the various ideologies clearly emerged. After the 5th Congress, the movement split, with the anarchist communists establishing an anti-authoritarian International. The IWMA was dissolved after its 6th Congress.

Conferences and Congresses of the IWMA 
 Preliminary Conference in London (United Kingdom), 25–29 September 1865. Preparation for the 1st Congress.
 1st Congress of Geneva (Switzerland), 3–8 September 1866.
 2nd Congress of Lausanne (Switzerland), 2–8 September 1867.
 3rd Congress of Brussels (Belgium), September 1868.
 4th Congress of Basel (Switzerland), September 1869.
 Conference of London (United Kingdom), 7–23 September 1871. Called as a result of the impossibility of holding the annual Congress because of the Franco-Prussian War and the Paris Commune in 1870 and 1871.
 5th Congress of The Hague (Netherlands), 2–7 September 1872.
 6th Congress of Geneva (Switzerland), 8 September 1873.
 International Convention of Philadelphia (USA), 15 July 1876. It was decided to disband the International.

The first anarchist congresses 
After the Hague Congress (1872), which saw the expulsion of the anarchists Mikhail Bakunin and James Guillaume, it was decided to hold a Congress of the anti-authoritarian Sections and Federations of the International in St. Imier, Switzerland. The Congress was attended by delegates of the International federations in Italy, Spain, Belgium, the United States, France and French-speaking Switzerland. It should be remembered that many sections of the International around this time had membership figures running into the thousands and tens of thousands.

This congress was not considered by the anarchists as the first of a new international organization, but rather the continuation of the old International. It rejected the modifications to the General Rules of the IWMA that had been decided at the London Conference (1871) and the Hague Congress (1872).

Congresses of the Anti-authoritarian IWMA 
International Congress of St. Imier (Switzerland), 15–16 September 1872.
 (6th) Congress of Neuchâtel (Switzerland), 27 September 1873. Abolition of the General Council and autonomy of federations.
 (7th) Congress of Brussels (Belgium), 7–12 September 1874.
 (8th) Congress of Bern (Switzerland), 26–29 October 1876.
 (9th) Congress of Verviers (Belgium), 6–8 September 1877.

After 1877, the anti-authoritarian International continued to function in certain areas (such as Spain, Tuscany and Switzerland) on a local level. A number of local or regional congresses were held, including an important congress of the Jura Federation (Switzerland) in September 1880 which was attended by a number of international delegates and observers. It was at this congress that the anarchist movement adopted anarchist communism as its goal.

Other Anarchist congresses until 1922 
 International Anarchist Congress of London, 14–20 July 1881.
 International Anarchist Congress of Amsterdam, 26–31 August 1907.

There were various other unsuccessful attempts to call international congresses, in Geneva (1882), Paris (1889), Chicago (1890) and again Paris (1900). A number of anarchists also attended the World Socialist Congress, which took place in Ghent (Belgium) from 9–15 September 1877. The Second International was set up in 1889, and many anarchists participated in it. Although they were expelled from the 3rd Congress, the 4th Congress in London in 1896 saw a continuation of the clash between libertarian and authoritarian socialism, with a number of anarchists, such as Malatesta and Cornelissen, in attendance.

The rebirth of the IWA 
Following the First World War and the Russian Revolution, anarchists and anarcho-syndicalists once again sought to rebuild the IWA. Initially intending to join with other revolutionary syndicalist organizations in the Bolshevik-led Profintern, libertarian unions became increasingly worried about the authoritarianism of the Bolsheviks and the subordination of Profintern to the Comintern. So, after two conferences in Berlin, the first from 16 to 21 December 1920 and the second from 16 to 18 June 1922, the new International Workingmen's Association (later to be known as the International Workers' Association) was born at its first congress in December 1922.

The IWA still exists today.

Congresses of the IWA 
 1st Congress, Berlin, 25 December 1922 to 2 January 1923.
 2nd Congress, Amsterdam, 25 March 1925.
 3rd Congress, Liège, 27–29 May 1928.
 4th Congress, Madrid, 16–21 June 1931.
 5th Congress, Paris, 24–31 August 1935.
 Extraordinary Congress, Paris, 6–17 December 1937.
 6th Congress, Paris, 29 October - 7 November 1938.
 7th Congress, Toulouse, 12–23 May 1951.
 8th Congress, Puteaux, July 1953.
 9th Congress Marseille, July 1956.
 10th Congress, Toulouse, August 1958.
 11th Congress, Bordeaux, 2–24 September 1961.
 12th Congress, Puteaux, November–December 1963.
 13th Congress, Bordeaux, 10–12 November 1967.
 14th Congress, Montpellier, October 1971.
 15th Congress, Paris, April 1976.
 16th Congress, Paris, April 1979.
 17th Congress, Madrid, 19–22 April 1984.
 18th Congress, Bordeaux, 1–3 April 1988.
 19th Congress, Cologne, April 1992.
 20th Congress, Madrid, 6–8 December 1996.
 21st Congress, Granada, December 2000.
 22nd Congress, Granada, 3–6 December 2004.
 23rd Congress, Manchester, 8–10 December 2006.
 24th Congress, Porto Alegre, 4–6 December 2009.
 25th Congress, Valencia, 6–8 December 2013.
 26th Congress, Warsaw, 2–4 December 2016.
 27th Congress, Melbourne, 28–30 December 2019.

Post-World War II Anarchist Congresses 
Anarchists continued to hold specifically anarchist congresses and conferences after the war, mostly focused on theoretical/ideological discussion. The objective was often the same: to create an international organization which would group together the various non-syndicalist anarchist organizations, i.e. those that were not already members of the IWA.

A stable international organization was finally established in 1968 at a congress in Carrara, Italy - the International of Anarchist Federations (IFA), which still exists today.

International Anarchist Congresses & Conferences 
 Paris, 15–17 May 1948; creation of the Anarchist International.
 Paris, 11 November 1949.
 Paris, 5–7 June 1954; creation of the Libertarian Communist International.
 Nice, December 1956; meeting of members of the Libertarian Communist International.
 Paris, 27 July 1958; meeting of the Libertarian Communist International.
 London, 25 July - 1 August 1958; creation of the Anarchist International Conference.
 Geneva, 15–16 September 1962.
 Turin, 1–2 May 1964.
 Bückeburg, Germany 19–24 July 1964.
 Carrara, 31 August 5 September 1968; 1st Congress of the IFA.
 2nd Congress of the IFA, Paris, 1–4 August 1971.
 3rd Congress of the IFA, Carrara, 23–27 March 1978.
 4th Congress of the IFA, Paris, 31 October - 3 November 1986.
 5th Congress of the IFA, Valencia, 1–4 November 1990.
 6th Congress of the IFA, Lyon, 31 October - 1/2 November 1997.
 International Conference, Madrid, 31 March - 1 April 2001; creation of the International Libertarian Solidarity (SIL/ILS) network.
 International SIL meeting, Seville, June 2002.
 International SIL meeting, Porto Alegre, 27 January 2003.
 7th Congress of the IFA, Besançon, 9–12 April 2004.
 8th Congress of the IFA, Carrara, 4–6 July 2008.
 1st Conference of European Anarkismo organizations, Paris, 6–7 February 2010.
 2nd Conference of European Anarkismo organizations, London, 26–27 February 2011; creation of the European Anarkismo Coordination.
 9th Congress of the IFA, Saint-Imier, 9–12 August 2013.
 3rd Conference of the European Anarkismo Coordination, Saint-Imier, 8 August 2013.
 International Conference of Anarkismo member organizations, Saint-Imier, 10 August 2013.
 10th Congress of the IFA, Frankfurt, 4–7 August 2016.
 11th Congress of the IFA, Ljubljana, 24–28 July 2019.

Bibliography 
 Iñiguez, Miguel. Esbozo de una Enciclopedia histórica del anarquismo español. Fundación de Estudios Libertarios Anselmo Lorenzo, Madrid, 2001; pg.162.y 163.
 McNab, Nestor (ed.). Manifesto del Comunismo Libertario. Georges Fontenis e il movimento anarchico francese. Centro Documentazione Franco Salomone, Fano, 2011.
 Skirda, Alexandre. Facing the Enemy. A History of Anarchist Organization from Proudhon to May 1968. AK Press, Edinburgh/Oakland, 2002.

References 

Anarchist organizations
History of anarchism
Political conferences